Dainius Kamaitis is the Lithuanian diplomat, former Ambassador Extraordinary and Plenipotentiary of the Republic of Lithuania to Japan, the Philippines, Australia and New Zealand.

During 2007–2012, he was the Lithuanian Governor to Asia-Europe Foundation (ASEF).

In 2003, he was awarded with The Cross of the Knight of the Order for Merits to Lithuania.

D.Kamaitis is the initiator and key coordinator of a series of events held under the Lithuania-Japan architecture forum known as East-East. For this initiative, he was nominated by the Embassy of Japan in Lithuania and the Čiurlionis Foundation for the award with the Čiurlionis Cup 2013 for having contributed to cultural relations between Japan and Lithuania.

In 2019, the Government of Japan awarded D.Kamaitis with The Order of the Rising Sun, Gold and Silver Star, in recognition to his contribution to strengthening and promoting friendly relations between Japan and Lithuania.

References 

Lithuanian diplomats
Living people
1965 births
Ambassadors of Lithuania to Japan
Vilnius Gediminas Technical University alumni
Knight's Crosses of the Order for Merits to Lithuania